Philippe Mory was a Gabonese actor and director, born in 1935 and died on 7 June 2016 in Libreville, Gabon. He is known for acting in the film The Cage, One Does Not Bury Sunday (1960) and directing Les tam-tams se sont tus (1972).

Career 
Philippe Mory began his film career in the mid-1950s with his role in the short film Afrique-sur-Seine directed by Paulin Soumanou Vieyra. He is the principal interpreter of Michel Drach's feature film Do not Bury Sunday, which won the Louis-Delluc Prize in 1959.

He returned to Gabon, where he was the scriptwriter and one of the actors of The Cage directed by Robert Darène. The film was produced and shot in Gabon and was selected for the Cannes Film Festival in 1963.

He was incarcerated for three years from 1964 to 1967 because of his participation in the coup against the Leon Mba, Gabon's first President.

After his release, he participated in the creation of the Pan African Federation of Filmmakers (FEPACI) in 1970. He was also involved in the founding of the National Center of Gabonese Cinema (CENACI).

He won the Golden Unicorn for Career Achievement at Amiens International Film Festival in the year 2011.

Filmography

As an actor 

 La rue des bouches peintes - 1955
 One Does Not Bury Sunday - 1960
 The Fruit Is Ripe - 1961
 The Cage - 1963 (Credited for writing in the film)
 Les tam-tams se sont tus - 1972 
 Djogo - 2002
 Le silence de la forêt - 2003
 Inspecteur Sori: Le mamba (TV series) - 2005
 L'ombre de Liberty - 2006
 Le mystère Joséphine (TV series) - 2009
 Héritage perdu - 2010
 Le collier du Makoko - 2013

As director 

 Les tam-tams se sont tus - 1972

References

External links 

1935 births
2016 deaths
Gabonese actors
Gabonese directors
21st-century Gabonese people